The 1970 Atlanta Braves season was the fifth season in Atlanta along with the 100th season as a franchise overall. The team finished fifth in the National League West with a record of 76–86, 26 games behind the National League Champion Cincinnati Reds.

Offseason 
 January 17, 1970: Jack Pierce was drafted by the Braves in the 2nd round of the 1970 Major League Baseball draft.

Regular season 
In 1970, the Braves franchise celebrated its 100th season.

Season standings

Record vs. opponents

Notable transactions 
 June 4, 1970: Rowland Office was drafted by the Braves in the 4th round of the 1970 Major League Baseball draft.
 July 5, 1970: Steve Barber was signed as a free agent by the Braves.
 July 12, 1970: Don Cardwell was purchased by the Braves from the New York Mets.
 August 31, 1970: Tony González was purchased from the Braves by the California Angels.
 September 21, 1970: Hoyt Wilhelm was selected off waivers from the Braves by the Chicago Cubs.

Roster

Player stats

Batting

Starters by position 
Note: Pos = Position; G = Games played; AB = At bats; H = Hits; Avg. = Batting average; HR = Home runs; RBI = Runs batted in

Other batters 
Note: G = Games played; AB = At bats; H = Hits; Avg. = Batting average; HR = Home runs; RBI = Runs batted in

Pitching

Starting pitchers 
Note: G = Games pitched; IP = Innings pitched; W = Wins; L = Losses; ERA = Earned run average; SO = Strikeouts

Other pitchers 
Note: G = Games pitched; IP = Innings pitched; W = Wins; L = Losses; ERA = Earned run average; SO = Strikeouts

Relief pitchers 
Note: G = Games pitched; W = Wins; L = Losses; SV = Saves; ERA = Earned run average; SO = Strikeouts

Farm system

Notes

References 

1970 Atlanta Braves season at Baseball Reference

Atlanta Braves seasons
Atlanta Braves season
Atlanta